The Ottawa International Animation Festival is an annual animated film and media festival that takes place in Ottawa, Ontario, Canada. The OIAF was founded in 1975, with the first festival held from August 10 to 15 in 1976. Initially organized by the Canadian Film Institute on a biennial basis and with the co-operation of the International Animated Film Association, the Festival organization now remains in the hands of the CFI. It moved from a biennial to an annual festival in 2005. Today the festival is recognized as the largest and oldest animation festival in North America, and regularly attracts upwards of 25,000 attendees when it is held each September.

History 
The Ottawa International Animation Festival was founded in 1975 by various figures in the world of Canadian animation, most prominently Bill Kuhns, Frederik Manter, Prescott J. Wright, Frank Taylor, and Kelly O'Brien. Many Canadian film and media institutions, such as the National Film Board of Canada, Télévision de Radio-Canada, CBC Television, and Cinémathèque Québécoise also played a fundamental role in building the festival into its present state.

Canada's national capital Ottawa was chosen as the host city due to its already strong film culture, being the former home of the NFB as well as many of Canada's first animation studios. Additionally, Ottawa was (at the time) home of famed Canadian animator and filmmaker Norman McLaren, who went on to be recognized for his contributions to the field of animation by the festival as its first Honorary President.

The OIAF experienced a brief change of location in 1984 when it was moved to Toronto and subsequently to Hamilton, Ontario in 1986 before settling back in Ottawa in 1990, where it has remained since. In 1999 the festival office suffered a fire, leading to many of the files from past years being lost. Nevertheless, the festival has continued to thrive. In 1997 the Ottawa International Student Animation Festival (SAFO) was founded and held in alternate years to the larger OIAF. In 2005 the OIAF moved from biennial to annual and as such the student categories became part of the main festival.

In 2002 the festival premiered its business conference component, originally called the Television Animation Conference and now known simply as The Animation Conference or TAC. The Animation conference runs concurrently with the festival and is aimed more at industry professionals than the general public, providing those in the animation industry an opportunity to network with their colleagues.

Today the OIAF continues to grow and is known in the festival world for its practice of pitting both commercial and independent projects in competition with one another, a strategy which leads to a wide breadth of styles and formats. The OIAF features traditionally-drawn animated films, animation made with computer graphics, and more recently, even projects made in virtual reality.

Grand prize winners 

2022 - Best Feature: Dozens of Norths - Koji Yamamura (France)
2022 - Best Short: Bird in the Peninsula - Atsushi Wada (France)
2021 - Best Short: Honekami (A Bite of Bone) - Honami Yano (Japan)
2021 - Best Feature: Bob Spit: We Do Not Like People - Cesar Cabral (Brazil)
2020 - Best Feature: Kill It and Leave This Town - Mariusz Wilczynski (Poland)
2020 - Best Short: KKUM - Kang-min Kim (South Korea/USA)
2019 - Best Feature: On-Gaku: Our Sound - Kenji Iwaisawa (Japan)
2019 - Best Short: Don't Know What - Thomas Renoldner (Austria)
2018 - Best Feature: This Magnificent Cake! - Emma de Swaef, Marc James Roels (Belgium)
2018 - Best Short: Solar Walk - Réka Bucsi (Denmark, Hungary) 
2017 - Best Feature: The Night Is Short, Walk on Girl - Masaaki Yuasa (Japan)
2017 - Best Short: Ugly - Nikita Diakur (Germany)
2016 - Best Feature: Louise en Hiver - Jean-François Laguionie (France/Canada)
2016 - Best Short: J'aime les filles - Diane Obomsawin (Canada) 
2015 - Best Short:  Small People With Hats - Sarina Nihei, (UK)
2015 - Best Feature:  Over the Garden Wall - Patrick McHale, (USA, South Korea)
2014 - Best Short:  Hippos (Hipopotamy) - Piotr Dumala, (Poland)
2014 - Best Feature: Seth's Dominion - Luc Chamberland, (Canada)
2013 - Best Feature: Tito on Ice - Max Andersson (Germany, Sweden)
2013 - Best Short: Lonely Bones - Rosto, (France, Netherlands)
2012 - Best Feature: Wrinkles - Ignacio Ferreras (Spain)
2012 - Best Short: Junkyard - Hisko Hulsing, (Netherlands)
2011 - Best Feature: Dead but not Buried - Phil Mulloy (UK)
2011 - Best Short: Moxie - Stephen Irwin (UK)
2010 - Best Feature: Goodbye Mister Christie - Phil Mulloy (UK)
2010 - Best Short: The External World - David O'Reilly (Ireland)
2009 - Best Short:  Kaasündinud Kohustused (Inherent Obligations) - by Rao Heidmets, Estonia
2009 - Best Feature:  Mary and Max - Adam Elliot (Australia)
2008 - Best Feature: Terra - Aristomenis Tsirbas (USA)
2008 - Best Short: Chainsaw - Dennis Tupicoff (Australia)
2007 - Best Feature: Persepolis - Marjane Satrapi (France)
2007 - Best Short: A Country Doctor - Koji Yamamura (Japan)
2006 - Best Feature: The Christies - Phil Mulloy (UK)
2006 - Best Short: Dreams & Desires: Family Ties - Joanna Quinn (UK)
2005 - Best Feature: The District! - Aron Gauder (Hungary)
2005 - Best Short: Milch - Igor Kovalyov (USA)
2004 - Best Feature: Raining Cats and Frogs - Jacques-Rémy Girerd (France)
2004 - Best Short: Ryan - Chris Landreth (Canada) 
2003 - Son of Satan - Jean-Jacques-Villard (USA)
2002 - Best Short: Home Road Movies - Robert Bradbrook (UK)
2002 - Best Feature: Waking Life - Richard Linklater (USA)
2001 - Dog - Suzie Templeton (UK)
2000 - Ring of Fire - Andreas Hykade (Germany)
1999 - Grace - Lorelei Pepi (USA)
1998 - The Night of the Carrots - Priit Pärn (Estonia)
1997 - We Lived In Grass - Andreas Hykade (Germany)
1996 - Bird in the Window - Igor Kovalyov (Russia/USA)
1994 - The Wrong Trousers - Nick Park (UK)
1992 - Two Sisters - Caroline Leaf (Canada)
1990 - Hen, His Wife - Igor Kovalyov (USSR)
1988 - The Man Who Planted Trees - Frederic Back (Canada)
1986 - The Frog, the Dog and the Devil - Bob Stenhouse (New Zealand)
1984 - Chips - Jerzy Kucia (Poland)
1982 - Crac - Frederic Back (Canada)
1980 - Ubu - Geoff Dunbar (UK)
1978 - Rowing Across the Atlantic - Jean-François Laguionie (France)
1976 - The Street - Caroline Leaf (Canada)

Venues 

The following venues host events and screenings during the Ottawa International Animation Festival:

 Ottawa Arts Court
 SAW Video
 SAW Gallery
 Ottawa Art Gallery
 National Gallery of Canada
 ByTowne Cinema
 Strathcona Park
 Pub 101
 Château Laurier
 National Arts Centre

References

External links

 Ottawa International Animation Festival
 
 Ottawa Announces Feature Contestants - Animation Magazine

Film festivals in Ottawa
Animation film festivals in Canada
Film festivals established in 1976
1976 establishments in Ontario